Li Xinggang (born 1969 in Laoting, Hebei) is a Chinese architect, director of Atelier Li Xinggang and vice chief architect of China Architectural Design & Research Group. He founded Atelier Li Xinggang in 2001, and including works with his studio has been involved in more than 30 projects. He has received several Chinese and international awards, and attended several exhibitions concerning architecture and art.

Biography
Li Xinggang was born in 1969. Upon graduating from the Department of Architecture, Tianjin University in 1991, he began to work in China Architecture Design & Research Group (CAG) China Architecture Design & Research Group to the present. In 2001, he acted as the chief architect of CAG. In 2003, he established his own atelier within CAG.

Li Xinggang is always interested in the Chinese feature in architecture, so he focuses on the classical Chinese gardens and their contemporary characteristics, as well as applies the modern architecture languages of structure and form, skin and material. He intends to strengthen personal design power, and express his own value judgment and architectural philosophy on these two main routes.

He has won several architecture honors and awards, and has also been invited to take part in some exhibitions concerning architecture and art. Atelier Li Xinggang advocates the process of "Research + Design", and emphasizes the response of architecture to the specificities of context, nature, site, material, and user. Atelier Li Xingang is self-sufficient being in charge of the full process of design as well as taking control of the building, interiors, and landscape. It is an approach to contemporary architectural works with cultural depth and aesthetic affection. Atelier Li Xinggang's research team is interested in "Chinese Gardens – Settlements" and "Ancient Master’s Studies", as well as others innovations.

"To me, the enigma of Architecture exists in its longevity and antiquation – its endurance and history are the result of natural instinct and rational logic. The so-called process of "design" is the journey looking for an only and perfect solution, solely realized after analyzing the various given conditions and possibilities. Naturally, the journey and goal depend on the tendency or impressions of the architect, in this case me – a specific Chinese person."
– Li Xinggang

Works
In his early works we can appreciate an interest in Chinese gardens. The design was just an expression of the fragmental feel of gardens. This influence continues during his career. Well known for his Sino/foreign cooperation in two big projects up to the moment, in Xihuan Plaza and the Xizhimen Transportation Hub, as the chief designer, he presided engineering design and particular work, cooperating with the French firm Arup it was just the beginning which gave him a basis for the Master Project of 2008 Beijing Olympic Games the design of “Bird’s Nest”, Beijing National Stadium. The dialogued with Herzog & de Meuron and the "structural" steel skin determining whether this design was in line with social demand and acceptable in China.

The development of this "skin-space" concept together with Chinese gardens gave maturity to the Office, the design of Li Xinggang seems swinging between modernism and tradition, or the combination of both. We can see several applications such as Reconstruction of No. B-59-1, Wenchuan Earthquake Memorial, Fuxing Road, Xi'erqi station on Beijing Subway Line 13, and Hainan International Convention And Exhibition Center in Haikou.

Publications and exhibitions

He was also invited to take part in some exhibitions concerning architecture and art, such as:

“From Beijing to London: 16 Contemporary Chinese Architects”, London (2012)

“Verso Est – New Chinese Architectural Landscape 2011”, Rome (2011)

“Chinese Regional Architecture in a Post-Experimental Age”, Karlsruhe/Prague (2010)

“Heart-Made – The Cutting-Edge of Chinese Contemporary Architecture”, Brussels (2009)

11th Venice Biennale of Architecture (2008)

“Illusion Into Reality: Chinese Gardens for Living”, Dresden (2008)

“Get It Louder”, Beijing (2007)

“Happen”, Left & Right Art Zone, Beijing (2007)

1st/2nd Shenzhen Biennale of Urbanism & Architecture (2005/2007)

“Status”: Eight Young Chinese Architects, Beijing (2005)

Selected work 
 Xingtao Residencial Quarter, Beijing 2002
 Xinhua Hotel, Tangshan 2001
 Teda Primary School, Tianjin 2000
 Xingtao Club, Beijing 2000
 Xizhimen Plaza & Xizhimen Transportation Exchange Hub, Beijing (cooperated with AREP, France) 2008
 Daxing Culture Center, Beijing 2006
 Competition for Conference & Exhibition Center of Zhongguancun Biological Science Park 2001
 Science Research Center & Service Facilities of Dongguan Technology Institute 2003
 Xing Tao Reception & Exhibition Center 2001
 Multi-Center of Songshanhu Culture Camp, Dongguan 2003
 Multi-Center of Songshanhu Culture Camp, Dongguan 2003
 Jianchuan Mirror Museum & Earthquake Memorial, Wenchuan Earthquake Memorial 2009
 Reconstruction Of No.B-59-1 Project, Fuxing Road 2005
 Office Building of Top China Microdevices 2005
 Hiland•Mingzuo Project, Weihai 2010
 Culture Center & Museum, Rushan 2007
 Ke Garden 2008
 Lego I 2007
 China Custom Museum (cooperated with Approach Architecture Studio) 2009
 Competition for Tangshan Earthquake Site Memorial Park 2007
 Competition for Shenzhen Bay Sports Center Competition, Nanshan District, Shenzhen 2007
 Couple Garden 2008
 Accesses Of Metro Line 4 & Daxing Line, Beijing 2010
 Lego II 2008
 Paper-brick House Venice Biennale 2008
 Interior Design of Atelier Li Xinggang Office 2008
 Shangqiu Museum 2010
 Xi'erqi station of Beijing Subway, Beijing 2009
 "The Third Space", Tangshan 2010
 Concept Design of Commercial Block of Dongsi station of Line 6, 2009
 Museum for Site of XANADU 2010
 Hainan International Convention And Exhibition Center, Haikou, Hainan 2010
 Section 2 of Bolonghu Headquarter Base, Tianjin 2009
 Jixi Museum, Anhui 2010
 20+10 Project D4 & P19, Erdos 2011
 Entrance for Site of XANADU 2011
 MAX LAB IV Competition, Sweden (cooperated with FOJAB, Sweden) 2010
 China Resources Hope Town, Xibaipo 2010
 Urban Design of CBD Core Area, Beijing 2010
 Concept Design of Canal Core Area VII09-14, Tongzhou, Beijing 2010
 Gymnasium & Natatorium of New Campus of Tianjin University 2011
 Competition for BIM Ecology Office Building of China Architecture Design & Research Group 2011
 Chinese Embassy in Madrid, Spain 2011
 Ampliation and Renovation of Chinese Embassy in Estonia
 Lüliang City Sports Center 2013
 Yuhuan County Library and Museum 2013

References

 http://www.cadreg.cn/team/list.asp?depart=18&class=0
 Chinese Paper Brick House at Architecture Biennale | Inhabitat - Sustainable Design Innovation, Eco Architecture, Green Building
 https://web.archive.org/web/20110929025133/http://www.worldlifes.com/html/zazhiqikan/_huanqiushenghuo_08_09qi/20100625/1286.html
 http://www.archcy.com/focus/membrane/a6e423c12db48f2d
 Olympic Stadium Beijing | Architectuul

External links
 [http://en.cadreg.com/team/index.shtml China Architecture Designjnn

Living people
Chinese architects
1969 births